The Book of Idols, written by the Arab scholar Hisham ibn al-Kalbi (737–819), describes gods and rites of pre-Islamic Arab religions. The text is critical of pre-Islamic Arabian religion and decries the state of religious corruption which the Arabs had supposedly descended to since the founding of the Kaaba. The book was instrumental in identifying shirk (the sin of polytheism) with "the idolatry of the pre-Islamic Arabs".

Ahmad Zaki Pasha, the Egyptian philologist, discovered the text; he bought the sole extant manuscript at auction in Damascus and the manuscript, one of many in his extensive collection, was donated to the state after his death in 1934. Zaki Pasha announced his discovery at the XIVth International Congress of Orientalists.

References

Translations
 English translation.

Additional literature
H. S. Nyberg. "Bemerkungen zum Buch der Götzenbilder von Ibn al-Kalbi." Lund: Svenska Institut i Rom. Ser. 2, Bd. 1, 1939. pp. 346–66.

12th-century manuscripts
Islamic literature
Religion in Saudi Arabia
Arabian mythology
Medieval Arabic literature